Wiligelmo (also known as Wiligelmus, Gulielmo da Modena, Cousin of Elmo or Guglielmo da Modena) was an Italian sculptor active between c. 1099 and 1120. He was the first sculptor in Italy to produce large-format sculptures and sign his work.

Wiligelmo was the carver of the reliefs known as Creation and Temptation of Adam and Eve found on the west facade frieze of Modena Cathedral (ca. 1110). The relief is marble and about one meter tall. His name is known from an epigraph carved as a postscript to the Latin inscription over the foundation date on that facade: Among sculptors, your work shines forth, Wiligelmo.

References

 

12th-century Italian sculptors
Italian male sculptors